Dok-7 is a non-catalytic cytoplasmic adaptor protein that is expressed specifically in muscle and is essential for the formation of neuromuscular synapses. Further, Dok-7 contains pleckstrin homology (PH) and phosphotyrosine-binding (PTB) domains that are critical for Dok-7 function. Finally, mutations in Dok-7 are commonly found in patients with limb-girdle congenital myasthenia.

Dok-7 regulates neuromuscular synapse formation by activating MuSK
The formation of neuromuscular synapses requires the muscle-specific receptor tyrosine kinase (MuSK). In mice genetically mutant for MuSK, acetylcholine receptors (AChRs) fail to cluster and motor neurons fail to differentiate. Because Dok-7 mutant mice are indistinguishable from MuSK mutant mice, these observations suggest Dok-7 might regulate MuSK activation. Indeed, Dok-7 binds phosphorylated MuSK and activates MuSK in purified protein preparations and in muscle in-vivo by transgenic overexpression. Furthermore, the nerve-derived organizing factor agrin fails to stimulate MuSK activation in muscle cells genetically null for Dok-7. Thus, Dok-7 is both necessary and sufficient for the activation of MuSK.

Dok-7 signaling
The requirement for MuSK in the formation of the NMJ was primarily demonstrated by mouse "knockout" studies. In mice which are deficient for either agrin or MuSK, the neuromuscular junction does not form.

Upon activation by its ligand agrin, MuSK signals via the proteins called Dok-7 and rapsyn, to induce "clustering" of acetylcholine receptors (AChR). Cell signaling downstream of MuSK requires Dok-7.  Mice which lack this protein fail to develop endplates.  Further, forced expression of Dok-7 induces the tyrosine phosphorylation, and thus the activation of MuSK.  Dok-7 interacts with MuSK by way of protein "domain" called a "PTB domain."

In addition to the AChR, MuSK, and Dok-7 other proteins are then gathered, to form the endplate to the neuromuscular junction. The nerve terminates onto the endplate, forming the neuromuscular junction—a structure which is required to transmit nerve impulses to the muscle, and thus initiating muscle contraction.

Congenital Myasthenia Syndrome
Homozygous mutation of Dok-7 is responsible for a form of congenital myasthenic syndrome (CMS) that is unique among disorders in this category because it affects muscles in the limbs and trunk but mostly spares the face, eyes, and functions of the mouth and pharynx (chewing, swallowing and speech). Salbutamol can be effective in relieving CMS symptoms attributable to Dok-7 mutations.

References

Developmental neuroscience
Proteins